This is a list of major characters appearing in the Big Bang Comics metaverse, which encompasses most fictional characters created for the shared Big Bang universe and those characters owned by Big Bang Comics.

Big Bang heroes

 The Badge (based on Guardian (DC Comics) and Captain America both created by Simon and Kirby)
 During WWII, he fought the Nazis as the Supreme Allied Commando, later became top agent of B.A.D.G.E., a spin on Nick Fury and S.H.I.E.L.D.
 The Beacon (based on Green Lantern)
 Beacon (Earth A): Dr Julia Gardner 
 Beacon (Earth B): Scott Martin
 Blackjack and his Flying Aces (based on Blackhawk)
 The Blitz (based on The Flash)
 The Blitz (Earth A): Jimmy Travis 
 The Blitz (Earth B): Mack Snelling
 Bluebird (appears to be inspired by Black Canary created by Robert Kanigher and Carmine Infantino)
 Cyclone (based on Kid Flash, the Blitz's sidekick from Earth A)
 Marty Eastman was addicted to the Rocket Pills that gave him his power. Later becomes the cybernetic Overdrive after being damaged in the explosion that killed the Blitz.
 Dimensioneer (teleportion via dimension control)
 Dr. Stellar
 Combines elements of Dr. Mid-Nite, Starman, and Adam Strange.
 Dr. Weird (created by Howard Keltner who was inspired by the comic book character Mr. Justice who appeared in Blue Ribbon Comics published by MLJ Magazines. Some resemblance to Doctor Fate and the Spectre)
 The Human Sub (based on Aquaman)
 Later became The Atomic Sub
 The Hummingbird (based on Silver Age version of The Atom created by Gardner Fox and Gil Kane)
 Jeena (pronounced Gina) the Jungle Girl
 Mentioned by Venus in Caliber #1, but has yet to make an appearance.
 Jon Cosmos (based on both Flash Gordon and Adam Strange)
 Knight Watchman (based on the Batman created by Bob Kane and Bill Finger for DC Comics) 
 Kid Galahad (based on Robin created by Bob Kane and Bill Finger and Jerry Robinson)
 Mighty Man (from the Savage Dragon)
 A tribute to the original C. C. Beck created Captain Marvel published by Fawcett Comics. Mighty Man was created by Erik Larsen.
 Mike Merlin/Ms. Merlin (Resembles Mark Merlin/Prince Ra-Man; some similarity to Snapper Carr)
 Mascot to the Roundtable of America.
 Mr. Martian (based on DC Comics's Martian Manhunter created by Jack Miller and Joe Certa)
 Mister U.S. (Based on Joe Simon and Jack Kirby's creation Captain America and on DC Comics Commander Steel)
 Mister US was a generic hero shown in issue #8 in six different incarnations from six different decades. The purpose was to poke fun at all the clichés in comics during each major era: the "Glittering Golden Age", the "Silly Side of the Silver Age", the "Pseudo-Intellectual Pseventies", the "'Oity-Toity Eighties", and the "Nigh-Incomprehensible Nineties".
 Moray (similar to Aqualad and Wonder Girl)
 The Sub's granddaughter and sidekick
 Protoplasman (based on Jack Cole's Plastic Man)
 Robo-Hood first appeared in Big Bang #21. Little is known about Robo-Hood, but he seems to tackle street-level crime like muggers and pickpockets. He is a combination of Robotman and Green Arrow, but his actual name seems to derive from the legend of Robin Hood, the English freedom fighter (or outlaw) well known for his clashes with Sheriff of Nottingham.
 Shadowhawk (Silver Age)
 A parody of the 1960-era Batman Comics Complete with the Shadowcar, Lady ShadowHawkette, Shadowdog and kid sidekick, Squirrel aka Hawk Shadow. Working with Knight Watchman
 Shadow Lady (based on Phantom Lady created by the  Eisner & Iger studio for Fox Feature Syndicate)
 Speed Queen (member of the RTA)
 The Sphinx (a hero from an Egypt-dominated alternate Earth, similar to Hawkman created by Gardner Fox and Dennis Neville)
 Sphinx: Peter Chefren/Chefren Ra
 Sphinx: Allison Kane
 Stars 'n' Stripes
 Possibly a reference to the Star-Spangled Kid and Stripesy. Appeared on a mock-up cover of the metafictional Red Hot Comics, but haven't been seen since.
 Super Frankenstein (possibly based on the 1960s Frankenstein by Dell Comics)
 Teen Rex (based on Kamandi created by Jack Kirby for DC Comics with a hint of Kirby's Devil Dinosaur for Marvel Comics)
 Billed as the "Last of the Dino Men".
 Thunder Girl (based on C. C. Beck's creation Mary Marvel)
 Ultiman (based on Superman created by Jerry Siegel and Joe Shuster for DC Comics)
 Ultragirl (based on Supergirl created by Otto Binder and Al Plastino for DC Comics)
 Ultiman's daughter (Earth B)
 US Angel (Golden Age winged hero)
 Venus (some resemblance to Wonder Woman)
 Vita-Man (based on Hourman created by Ken Fitch and Bernard Bailey for DC Comics)
 Zhantika Princess of the Jungle (most likely based on Sheena but may just be a generic jungle girl)

Big Bang hero teams

Round Table of America (RTA) Earth A 

(Based on the Justice League title published by DC Comics)
 Ultiman
 Knight Watchman
 Thunder Girl
 The Blitz: Jimmy Travis
 Beacon: Dr Julia Gardner
 Human Sub
 Mike Merlin (Team mascot, first appeared in Image issue #12)

Knights of Justice Earth B

(Based on the Justice Society title published by DC Comics)
 Ultiman
 Dr. Weird
 The Blitz: Mack Snelling
 Beacon: Scott Martin
 Venus

Pantheon of Heroes Earth A

(Based on the Legion of Super-Heroes title published by DC Comics)
 Clone Boy (founder)
 Gravity Girl (founder)
 Laughing Boy (founder)
 Galactic Lad: Noa Zark 
 Snowstar 
 Anglefish 
 Nature Boy (deceased)
 Brain Boy 
 Telegirl
 Ghost Girl 
 Photon (formerly Lamp Lass)
 Jupiter Boy
 Dragonfist (formerly Combat Kid)
 Anti-Matter Lad
 Golden Girl
 Stacy & Tracy the Titan Twins
 Butterfly Queen
 Omega Boy
 Robo Kid
 Kid Warlock
 Lionclaw
 Aviatrix
 Manta Rae
 Ant Boy

Verdict
(Based on the Outsiders title published by DC Comics)
 Psi-Mage
 Kuttar
 Hot-Wire
 Quintessence Whiz Kids (Whizzards) Earth A 

(Based on the Teen Titans title published by DC Comics)
 Kid Galahad (based on Robin / Nightwing)
 Moray (based on Aqualad and Wonder Girl)
 Cyclone (based on Kid Flash / Flash)
 Thunder Girl (based on Mary Marvel)
 She-Borg (based on Cyborg)
 Black Power Totem Gargoyla Hot Pink''

Big Bang humor strips
 Op the Cop: A humour strip written by Gary Carlson, featured in Caliber Press Issue #1. Op hasn't appeared since.
 Percy: The second and final humour strip in Big Bang Comics, this time satirising the older generation of science-fiction films. Appeared in Image Comics Issue #1.

References

External links
 Big Bang Comics - the official site
 Big Bang Comics webpage on International Superheroes
 Cosmic Teams: Round Table of America
 Cosmic Teams: Pantheon of Heroes 
 Hyperborea: The Blitz
  Micro Heroes: Big Bang Characters

 
Big Bang Comics
Image Comics superheroes